The 2016 SprintX GT Championship Series was the inaugural season of the SprintX GT Championship Series. The series was managed by WC Vision and sanctioned by the Sports Car Club of America (SCCA). On May 28, 2015 WC Vision announced it would be launching the SprintX GT Championship Series as a support series of the Pirelli World Challenge. Similar to GT races in the PWC, SprintX races had a sprint format as races were 60 minutes in length. The difference between PWC GT races and SprintX races was that SprintX races featured mandatory driver and tire changes.

Schedule
The season comprised three rounds and all rounds were in support of the Pirelli World Challenge. On the same day WC Vision announced the launch of the series, they announced the series would be run during all "headliner" event weekends of the PWC - the calendar of the 2016 PWC season was announced on November 3, 2015. Later WC Vision decided the series would not run during the season opener of the PWC at Austin and during the PWC weekend at Lime Rock Park.

Entry list

GT

Notes

GT Cup

GTS

Race results

Championship standings

Drivers' championships
Points were awarded based on finishing positions as shown in the chart below. Points were awarded to the driver behind the wheel at the 25-minute mark (when Pit Lane opens for mandatory tire and driver changes) and to the driver behind the wheel at the finish.

GT

GT Cup

GTS

References

GT World Challenge America
SprintX GT Championship Series